Allopregnanediol, or 5α-pregnane-3α,20α-diol, is an endogenous metabolite of progesterone and allopregnanolone and an isomer of pregnanediol (5β-pregnan-3α,20α-diol). It has been found to act like a partial agonist of an allosteric site of the GABA receptor and hence might play a biological role as a neurosteroid. It has also been found to act as an agonist of the human pregnane X receptor, albeit with an EC50 that is more than an order of magnitude lower than that of other endogenous pregnanes like pregnenolone, pregnanediol, allopregnanedione, and allopregnanolone.

Chemistry

References

Diols
GABAA receptor positive allosteric modulators
Human metabolites
Neurosteroids
Pregnane X receptor agonists
Pregnanes